Satu Mattila-Budich is a Finnish diplomat and Foreign Affairs Counselor. She has been Head of the Permanent Representation of Finland to the Council of Europe in Strasbourg, France, from 1 September 2015. She started working with the Ministry for Foreign Affairs in 1983.

Prior to the Council of Europe, Mattila-Budich has worked as a leading expert at the Finnish Embassy in Riga, and before that she served as Co-ordinator and Chairman of the Baltic Sea States Council (CBSS) during the Finnish Presidency. She was Finland's ambassador to Singapore 2007–2011. Mattila-Budich also served in Finland's permanent UN missions in Geneva and New York, at the Embassy in New Delhi and Washington DC, and in Tokyo, where she also served as the Council of Ministers.

Mattila-Budich has worked in the Foreign Ministry at the Protocol and Political Department in Finland. Between 2001 and 2004, she was in charge of the Northern Dimension Unit in the Eastern section.

References

Year of birth missing (living people)
Living people
Ambassadors of Finland to Singapore
Finnish women ambassadors